Populus laurifolia, the laurel poplar, is a species of flowering plant in the family Salicaceae, native to Kazakhstan, the Altai, Mongolia, and Xinjiang in China. It hybridizes readily with other species of poplar, and has high genetic variation.

References

laurifolia
Plants described in 1833